2-Phenyl-3,5-dimethylmorpholine is a drug with stimulant and anorectic effects, related to phenmetrazine. Based on what is known from other phenylmorpholines with similar structure, it likely acts as a norepinephrine-dopamine releasing agent and may produce effects similar or slightly different to phenmetrazine.

See also 

 3-Fluorophenmetrazine
 G-130 (2-Phenyl-5,5-dimethylmorpholine)
 3,4-Phendimetrazine (2-Phenyl-3,4-dimethylmorpholine)
 3,6-Phendimetrazine (2-Phenyl-3,6-dimethylmorpholine)
 4-Methylphenmetrazine
 Manifaxine
 Radafaxine
 Viloxazine

References

Anorectics
 
Stimulants
Substituted amphetamines
Phenylmorpholines